Genesung is an East German film. It was released in 1956.

External links
 

1956 films
East German films
1950s German-language films
Films directed by Konrad Wolf
1950s German films
German black-and-white films
German war films
1956 war films